Hemistomia neku is a species of minute freshwater snail with an operculum, an aquatic gastropod mollusc or micromollusc in the family Hydrobiidae. This species is only known from four specimens collected in Péyia, in the community of Oua Oué, Bourail, New Caledonia.

See also
List of non-marine molluscs of New Caledonia

References

Hemistomia
Endemic fauna of New Caledonia
Gastropods described in 1998
Freshwater molluscs of Oceania